A Chicago-style hot dog, Chicago Dog, or Chicago Red Hot is an all-beef frankfurter on a poppy seed bun, originating from the city of Chicago, Illinois. The hot dog is topped with yellow mustard, chopped white onions, bright green sweet pickle relish, a dill pickle spear, tomato slices or wedges, pickled sport peppers (a variety of Capsicum annuum), and a dash of celery salt. The complete assembly of a Chicago hot dog is said to be "dragged through the garden" due to the many toppings. The method for cooking the hot dog itself varies depending on the vendor's preference. Most often they are steamed, water-simmered, or less often grilled over charcoal (in which case they are referred to as "char-dogs").

The canonical recipe does not include ketchup, and there is a widely shared, strong opinion among many Chicagoans and aficionados that ketchup is unacceptable. A number of Chicago hot dog vendors do not offer ketchup as a condiment.

History
The hot dog arrived in Chicago through Frankfurt from Vienna. Pork sausages have been known in Frankfurt since the 13th century. Sometime in the 19th century a butcher in Vienna added beef to the sausage mixture. He called this a "wiener-frankfurter". Eventually reaching Chicago, Franks served in buns became popular at fairs and baseball games. Reportedly the pork-free and kosher-style all beef frank was originated by Fluky's in 1929. During the Great Depression they were sold for a nickel out of carts along Maxwell Street. Two Austrian Hungarian immigrants sold their Vienna Beef franks at the 1893 World's Columbian Exposition in Chicago.  Vienna Beef became a major producer of hot dogs and by the early 2000s was one of the major suppliers for hot dog carts.

Variations
The "dragged through the garden" style is heavily promoted by Vienna Beef and Red Hot Chicago, the two most prominent Chicago hot dog manufacturers, but exceptions are common, with vendors adding  cucumber slices or lettuce, omitting poppyseeds or celery salt, or using plain relish or a skinless hot dog. Several popular hot dog stands serve a simpler version known as the "Depression Dog": a steamed natural-casing dog with only mustard, onions, plain relish and sport peppers, wrapped up with hand-cut french fries, while the historic Superdawg drive-ins notably substitute a pickled tomato for fresh.  Many vendors offer a Chicago-style dog with cheese sauce, known as a cheese-dog. Boz Hot Dogs locations offer a unique nacho cheese sauce with pieces of jalapeño peppers.

Preparation
Chicago-style hot dogs are cooked in hot water or steamed before adding the toppings. A less common style is cooked on a charcoal grill and referred to as a "char-dog". Char-dogs are easily identifiable because very often the ends of the dog are sliced in crisscross fashion before cooking, producing a distinctive cervelat-style "curled-x" shape as the dog cooks. Some hot dog stands, such as The Wieners Circle, only serve char-dogs.

The buns are a high-gluten variety made to hold up to steam warming, typically the S. Rosen's Mary Ann brand from Alpha Baking Company.

The traditional "neon-green" relish is prepared by simply adding blue food coloring to sweet pickle relish until the natural yellow hue turns a deep green.

Restaurants
The Chicago area has more hot dog restaurants than McDonald's, Wendy's, and Burger King restaurants combined. A "hot dog stand" in Chicago may serve many other items, including the Maxwell Street Polish, gyros, pork chop and Italian beef sandwiches, corn dogs, tamales, pizza puffs and Italian ice. The restaurants often have unique names or architectural features.

Popular and historic vendors

 Fluky's
 Gene & Jude's
 Hot Doug's (closed)
 Portillo's
 Superdawg
 The Wieners Circle
 Woody's Chicago Style

See also

 Chicago-style pizza
 Coney Island hot dog
 Cuisine of Chicago
 Francheezie
 Hot dog variations
 Italian Beef
 List of hot dogs
 Maxwell Street Polish

References

Further reading

External links
 

Cuisine of Chicago
Cuisine of the Midwestern United States
Hot dogs
Celery